The Phoenix Inferno was an American indoor soccer team in Phoenix, Arizona, that played in the Major Indoor Soccer League from 1980 to 1983.  In 1983 new ownership renamed the team the Phoenix Pride.  The Pride folded at the end of the 1983–1984 season.  Both teams played their home games at the Arizona Veterans Memorial Coliseum.

The Phoenix Inferno, owned by Richard Ragone and later Irv Berger, entered the Major Indoor Soccer League in 1980.  The Phoenix Inferno bumper stickers read "Our Balls Are Off The Wall."  Original owner Ragone was killed in a December 1981 car crash. In January 1983, Berger filed for bankruptcy.  The league approved the sale of the team to Bruce Merrill, chairman of American Cable Television, for $175,000.

Year-by-year

Phoenix Pride
When Bruce Merrill purchased the Phoenix Inferno, he brought in Ted Podleski as general manager.  A devout Christian, Podleski objected to the use of the word Inferno and Merrill renamed the team the Pride.  On March 3, 1984, Podleski fired the head coach and installed himself as head coach despite never playing or coaching soccer before.  The team finished the season at 18–30 and failed to qualify for the playoffs.  Merrill put the team up for sale in June 1984.  When he received no offers, he folded the team in July.

Year-by-year

References

External links
 Phoenix Inferno rosters
 Phoenix Pride rosters
 Phoenix Pride
 MISL: 1983–1984

Defunct indoor soccer clubs in the United States
Sports in Phoenix, Arizona
Major Indoor Soccer League (1978–1992) teams
Soccer clubs in Arizona
1984 disestablishments in Arizona
1980 establishments in Arizona
Association football clubs established in 1980
Association football clubs disestablished in 1984